Siad may refer to the following notable people:

Given name
 Siad Barre (1919–1995), Somali politician
 Siad Haji (born 1999), Kenyan-born football player

Surname
 Fatima Siad (born 1986), Ethiopian-Somali fashion model
 Mohamed Siad, multiple people
Patrick Erouart-Siad (born 1955), French writer